During the 2007–08 English football season, Stockport County F.C. competed in Football League Two.

Season summary
Stockport County defeated Rochdale in the play-off final to gain promotion to League One.

League table

First-team squad
Squad at end of season

Left club during season

Notes

References

2007-08
2007–08 Football League Two by team